UglyDolls: Original Motion Picture Soundtrack is the soundtrack album to the 2019 STX Entertainment film UglyDolls, released on April 26, 2019, by Atlantic Records. The soundtrack features Kelly Clarkson, Nick Jonas, Janelle Monáe, Bebe Rexha, Blake Shelton, Pentatonix, Anitta, and Why Don't We. Clarkson's track "Broken & Beautiful" was released prior to the album, on March 27, 2019, as the soundtrack's lead single. Anitta's track "Ugly" was also released prior to the album's release.

Track listing

Notes
  signifies an additional producer
  there’s a Portuguese version also performed by Anitta

Charts

References

2019 soundtrack albums
Atlantic Records soundtracks
Musical film soundtracks
Comedy film soundtracks
Animated film soundtracks